Geovanis Cassiani Gómez (born January 10, 1970, in Turbo, Antioquia), known as Geovanis Cassiani,  is a Colombia former footballer who played as a centre-back. He played for the Colombia national team at the 1992 Summer Olympics in Barcelona, Spain, wearing the #13 jersey. Cassiani also was a member of the 1990 FIFA World Cup squad. In Argentina, he played 10 matches in Rosario Central, in the 1998–99 season.

He is the younger brother of Francisco Cassiani.

Notes

References

External links
 
 

1970 births
Living people
Colombian footballers
Colombian people of Italian descent
Association football defenders
Colombia international footballers
Colombia under-20 international footballers
1990 FIFA World Cup players
Categoría Primera A players
Atlético Nacional footballers
América de Cali footballers
Deportes Tolima footballers
Envigado F.C. players
Footballers at the 1992 Summer Olympics
Olympic footballers of Colombia
Rosario Central footballers
Sportspeople from Antioquia Department
Colombian expatriate footballers
Colombian expatriate sportspeople in Argentina
Expatriate footballers in Argentina